Elections to Rochford Council were held on 7 May 1992.  One third of the council was up for election.

Results summary

Ward results

Ashington

Downhall

Grange & Rawreth

Hawkwell East

Hakewell West

Hockley Central

Hockley East

Hockley West

Hullbridge Riverside

Hullbridge South

Lodge

Rayleigh Central

Rochford St. Andrew's

References

1992
1992 English local elections
1990s in Essex